Henry Wetherby Benchley (February 20, 1822 – February 24, 1867) was an American politician who served in the Massachusetts Senate and as the 22nd Lieutenant Governor of Massachusetts. In the 1850s, he was one of the founders of the Republican Party.

Biography
Benchley's immigrant ancestor was William Benchley, who had settled in Rhode Island from Wales. By the 1840s, Benchley's line had moved from Smithfield, Rhode Island to Worcester, Massachusetts. He married Julia and they had two sons, Charles and Julian. Benchley became active in regional politics, helping found the Republican Party in the 1850s. He also served in the Massachusetts Senate from Worcester, and was elected as Lieutenant Governor of Massachusetts in the mid-1850s.

After Julia's death in 1854, Benchley arranged for relatives to care for his sons and went to Texas to oppose the institution of slavery. He was arrested and jailed in Houston for helping run an Underground Railroad station. This was after the Fugitive Slave Law of 1850 was passed, which increased penalties for anti-slavery activism. He died in Houston in 1867 after the Civil War ended.

Legacy
His grandson, Robert Benchley, became a famed humorist based in New York City. His great-grandson, Nathaniel Benchley, and great-great-grandson, Peter Benchley, also became noted authors.

See also
 76th Massachusetts General Court (1855)

References

 Billy Altman, Laughter's Gentle Soul: The Life of Robert Benchley. (New York City: W. W. Norton, 1997. ).
 Norris W. Yates, Robert Benchley. (New York City, Twayne Publishers, 1968.).
 Roger D. Joslyn, "The Benchley-Bensley Family", New England Historical and Genealogical Register. Vol. CXLII No. 565-567 (January, April 1988, July 1988).

1822 births
1867 deaths
Lieutenant Governors of Massachusetts
Massachusetts Know Nothings
Republican Party Massachusetts state senators
Presidents of the Massachusetts Senate
American city founders
People from Chester County, Pennsylvania
Texas Republicans
Politicians from Houston